'Master Viswam was a child actor during the early era of Telugu Cinema during the British era of India. He shot to fame with the role of Balawardhiraju in 1942 Balanagamma movie produced by Gemini Studios.

Birth and childhood
Master Viswam was born as Vuppala Viswanadham on 7 January 7, 1932, at Jaggayyapeta, Krishna district, Andhra Pradesh to Vuppala Pullayya and Kanakaratnam. His parents shifted later to Nalgonda during his childhood. Telugu actor Kanta Rao used to reside in the opposite house of Viswam and Rao mentioned in his own autobiography Anaganaga Oka Rakumarudu that he was inspired by Viswam towards acting in movies. During his school days in 1949, Mir Osman Ali Khan, the Nizam of Hyderabad was chief guest of Nalgonda Health, Agricultural & Industrial Exhibition. Viswam drew a pencil sketch of Nizam on that stage itself and presented it him. The Nizam was so impressed that he gifted him a gold medal on March 26, 1949.

Cinema career
Since, his father was a music-lover, Viswam was taught Carnatic and Hindustani music from Pandit Mandapati Venkatraju at Nalgonda. In 1940, Bhavani Pictures produced Chandika movie under direction of R. S. Prakash and were looking for child artists. They gave such advertisement in newspaper and Viswam's father applied it casually. In those days more than beauty, the emphasis for selection was more on singing and poetic skills. Viswam was selected and he sang a poem, రాచపుట్టువునకు రణమందు మృతికన్న భాగ్యమేమి? (rAcapuTTuvunaku raNamandu mRtikanna bhAgyamEmi?). He was introduced by Bhavani Pictures group as Master Viswam in that movie. Thus he got introduced to Kannamba, Vemuri Gaggaiah, Bellary Raghava and others. Through them, he got opportunity to act as cowherd boy, Ganesha Bhattu in Bhookailas Telugu movie, produced by A. V. Meiyappan and directed by Sundar Rao Nadkarni. That movie was based on Mahabaleshwara temple legend at Gokarna, Karnataka. Bhookailas was the first blockbuster for AVM Productions. He later acted as Balavardhiraju in Gemini Studios production 1942 blockbuster movie, Bala Nagamma. It is based on famous Telugu Burrakatha folklore story of a queen Balanagamma abducted in the form of a dog by an evil magician, Mayala Marathi and later released by her son Balavardhiraju. That film got much fame and fanfare to Viswam. Kanchanamala  acted as Balanagamma and Govindarajula Subbarao took the role of Mayala Marathi.

He later acted in 1942 movie Jeevan Mukthi as Bhavudu. That movie was also produced by S. S. Vasan of Gemini Studios. However, that movie was a miserable flop. In 1944, Pratibha group produced Sitaramajananam movie and were looking for the roles of Rama and Lakshmana. He was called for that and they tested him with makeup. However, may be due to his young age, he was not selected. However, by putting away Viswam in that movie, it paved role for another great actor to have his debut. He was none other than Akkineni Nageswara Rao.

Later life
Due to demise of his father at the age of 14–15, he completely quit movies. He was good painter and used to sell oil paintings. Later, he finished M. A. and worked as English lecturer at Khammam, Nalgonda and Suryapet. Even after many years, those who remembered his role in Balanagamma used to get autograph from him. Viswam continued his music practice music and even composed few songs. Occasionally he was offered to sing by All India Radio  At Hyderabad radio, he used to sing songs of C. Narayana Reddy and Dasaradhi. He even performed once before Pandit Jawaharlal Nehru, then Prime minister of India. Thus, he gained good fame as radio singer. Viswam had three daughters and one son, Srinivas who is an employee of BSNL at Kodad. He died on 8 April 2004.

Filmography 
 Chandika (చండిక), 1940,
 Bhookailas (భూకైలాస్), 1940,
 Bala Nagamma (బాలనాగమ్మ), 1942,
 Jeevan Mukthi (జీవన్ముక్తి), 1942.

References

1932 births
2004 deaths
Indian male film actors
Male actors from Andhra Pradesh
Male actors from Telangana
20th-century Indian male actors
Indian male child actors
Telugu male actors
People from Krishna district
People from Khammam district